Zinc chlorate (Zn(ClO3)2) as an inorganic chemical compound used as an oxidizing agent in explosives.

References

zinc
chlorate